Trần Văn Thời is a township (Thị trấn) and capital town of Trần Văn Thời District, Cà Mau Province, in Vietnam.

Populated places in Cà Mau province
Communes of Cà Mau province
District capitals in Vietnam
Townships in Vietnam